Malmö FF competed in Division 1 Svenska Serien Västra for the 1922-23 season.

Players

Squad stats

|}

Club

Other information

Competitions

Overall

Division 1 Svenska Serien Västra

Results summary

References
 

1922-23
Association football clubs 1922–23 season
Swedish football clubs 1922–23 season